Pereleski is the name of several rural localities in Russia:
Pereleski, Belgorod Oblast, a khutor in Prokhorovsky District, Belgorod Oblast
Pereleski, Chernyakhovsky District, Kaliningrad Oblast, a village in Chernyakhovsky District in Kaliningrad Oblast
Pereleski, Zelenogradsky District, Kaliningrad Oblast, a village in Zelenogradsky District in Kaliningrad Oblast 
Pereleski, Penza Oblast, a selo in Gorodishchensky District in Penza Oblast
Pereleski, Yaroslavl Oblast, a village in Pereslavsky District in Yaroslavl Oblast

See also
Perelisky (disambiguation)